Roewe  is a vehicle marque created by the Chinese automaker SAIC Motor in 2006, focuses in luxury cars. Roewe vehicles were initially based on technology acquired from defunct British  carmaker MG Rover. SAIC was unable to purchase the rights to the Rover brand name (which was retained by BMW, subsequently sold to Ford and ultimately returned to Jaguar Land Rover) and created the Roewe marque as a replacement. It is sold in most export markets outside China under the MG marque.

Name
The name Roewe originates from SAIC's failure to acquire the Rover brand name from BMW c. 2005 (it was instead sold to Ford in 2006, and the brand is currently owned by Jaguar Land Rover). Composed of the Chinese characters Róng and wēi, which roughly mean "glorious power", the name is a transliteration of Rover, although SAIC has stated that it is derived from Löwe, the German word for lion.

History
SAIC purchased technology relating to the Rover 75 and Rover 25 after the 2005 collapse of MG Rover, and the Roewe marque first appeared on a version of the 75, the Roewe 750. Originally intending to purchase all assets of the failed British company, SAIC was outbid by Nanjing Automobile. In 2007, SAIC merged with Nanjing Auto, so it now controls those MG Rover properties, such as the MG name and a Birmingham factory, the Longbridge plant, that it was initially unable to acquire.

English engineering firm Ricardo assisted the development of early Roewe models and set up a new company in the UK, Ricardo (2010) Consultants Ltd, which helped bring the 750 to market. According to SAIC, work on the vehicle was also done in China. In 2007, Ricardo (2010) Consultants was purchased by SAIC and renamed SAIC Motor UK Technical Centre. It employs over 200 British ex-Rover engineers.

The Roewe brand unveiled the Roewe Vision-R electric concept car at the 2015 Guangzhou Auto Show in China that and previews a new generation of the Roewe design language for the Chinese brand, featuring sharp creases and a full width grille that evolved from the previous Roewe shield grille. The new design theme was applied to products launched shortly after such as the Roewe i5, i6, RX3, RX5, RX7, RX8, and Marvel X, as well as facelifts of the Roewe 950 and Roewe 360 Plus.

Current models

 Roewe Clever — An all-electric supermini, the successor of the Roewe E50.
 Roewe i5/Ei5 — A compact station wagon.
 Roewe i6/ei6/i6 Max/ei6 Max —A compact sedan 
 Roewe RX3/ RX3 Pro — A subcompact crossover
 Roewe RX5/eRX5/ERX5/RX5 Plus - A compact crossover, with hybrid and full-electric options. 
 Roewe RX5 Max — A more upmarket mid-size crossover based on the RX5. 
 Roewe Marvel X/ Marvel R — An electric mid-size CUV 
 Roewe RX8 — Roewe's flagship full size SUV
 Roewe RX9 — 
 Roewe iMAX8 — The Roewe iMAX8 is a minivan produced by Roewe since 2020.

Concepts 

 Roewe Whale / Roewe Jing
 Roewe Vision-R
 Roewe R-Aura

Former models

 Roewe 950/ e950 — Executive sedan and the flagship model of the Roewe range
 Roewe 750 (2006-2016) — A mid-size luxury sedan, based on the Rover 75
 Roewe 550 (2008-2014) — A compact car, also based on the Rover 75
 Roewe 360/360 Plus. — A compact sedan, replacement for the outdated Roewe 350
 Roewe 350 (2010-2014) — A compact car
 Roewe W5 (2011-2017) — A mid-size SUV, based on the SsangYong Kyron 
 Roewe E50 (2013-2016) — An all-electric supermini
 Roewe 850 (????-????) — A full-size luxury sedan, based on the SsangYong Chairman

Product Gallery 
Former products:

Current products:

Sales
A total of 155,336 Roewe vehicles were sold in China in 2013, making it the 29th largest-selling car brand in the country in that year (and the 13th largest-selling Chinese brand).

Exports
Outside of China, Roewe-derived models are currently sold under the MG marque.

In 2008, the Roewe 550 and 750 were launched in Chile under the names MG 550 and MG 750, respectively. The smaller MG 350 and sporty MG 6 were displayed at the eleventh Santiago Motor Show in October 2010.

European sales first began in Belarus, with an MG-badged version of the 550. British car magazine Autocar tested the Roewe 350 in 2010 suggesting that the model would be built and sold in the UK, but Roewe denied this. Nonetheless, as of April 2011 SAIC's MG6 (a reworked Roewe 550) commenced assembly at the old MG Rover plant in Longbridge. The European market cars feature certain improvements over its Chinese siblings, meeting Euro V rather than Euro IV emissions standards.

References

External links

  (Chinese)

 
Vehicle manufacturing companies established in 2006
SAIC Motor brands
Luxury motor vehicle manufacturers
Chinese brands
Car brands